Carters Lake is a man-made reservoir located on the Coosawattee River in the Blue Ridge Mountains in Gilmer and Murray counties in the U.S. state of Georgia. It is the state's deepest lake.

Description
While the reservoir is on the Coosawattee River, it empties directly into the Regulation Reservoir (another reservoir on the river). The reservoir was named after Farrish Carter who lived in the 19th century.

Carters Lake, owned by the US Army Corps of Engineers, is a man-made lake without private docks or houses along its shore. This lake is fed by the Coosawattee River that runs between Ellijay and Chatsworth, and was formed by Carters Dam, the tallest earthen dam east of the Mississippi, which was completed in 1977. Since then, it has been used to act as a watershed to control annual flooding and generate power. Carters Lake is also used for various forms of outdoor recreation such as fishing, water skiing, hiking, camping, and mountain biking.

Construction of the dam, and the filling in of the lake, destroyed the site of Coosa. That town was the seat of a paramount chiefdom of the Mississippian culture in 1540 when De Soto and his men visited the site on their expedition.

The lake served as inspiration for the wild river that was tamed by a dam in the novel and film Deliverance by James Dickey.

See also

 List of dams and reservoirs in Georgia (U.S. state)

References

External links

 

Reservoirs in Georgia (U.S. state)
Blue Ridge Mountains
Protected areas of Gilmer County, Georgia
Protected areas of Murray County, Georgia
Bodies of water of Gilmer County, Georgia
Bodies of water of Murray County, Georgia
1977 establishments in Georgia (U.S. state)